Kumaranellur is a small Village/hamlet in Pattambi Taluk in Palakkad District of Kerala, India. It comes under Kappur Grama Panchayath. It is located 75 km westwards from District headquarters Palakkad, 48 km southwards from the neighbouring district headquarters Malappuram, 27 km from Tirur, 22 km from Valanchery, 20 km from Pattambi, 20 km from Kunnamkulam, 15 km from Ponnani, 14 km from Kuttippuram, 8 km from Thrithala, and 5 km from Edappal town. This Place is in the border of the Palakkad District and Malappuram District. Malappuram District Kuttippuram is North towards this place and Edappal is westward from this place. Kumaranellur basically depends upon neighbouring Ponnani, Edappal, and Kuttippuram in Malappuram district for education and healthcare purposes. It is a part of Thrithala (State Assembly constituency) and Ponnani (Lok Sabha constituency).

Local administration 
The region is administered by the Kappur Grama Panchayat. It is composed of 18 wards:

Notable residents
 V. T. Bhattathiripad, Dramatist and a prominent freedom fighter
 Maha Kavi Akkitham Achuthan Namboothiri (Jnanpit Award Winner)
 Thrithala Kesava Poduval, Thayambaka Maestro
 M. T. Vasudevan Nair, Malayalam Writer & Jnanpit Award Winner

Demographics
As of the 2001 India census, Kumaranellur had a population of 7,260, consisting of 3,465 males and 3,795 females.

References

External links 

Villages in Palakkad district